Georgiana Freeman (born 24 March 1956) is a Gambian sprinter. She competed in the women's 4 × 100 metres relay at the 1984 Summer Olympics.

References

External links
 

1956 births
Living people
Athletes (track and field) at the 1984 Summer Olympics
Gambian female sprinters
Olympic athletes of the Gambia
Athletes (track and field) at the 1970 British Commonwealth Games
Athletes (track and field) at the 1978 Commonwealth Games
Athletes (track and field) at the 1982 Commonwealth Games
Commonwealth Games competitors for the Gambia
Place of birth missing (living people)
Olympic female sprinters